Ryen Jiba (born 29 April 2001) is a South Sudanese footballer who plays as an fullback for Major League Soccer side Minnesota United.

Career

Early career
Jiba was born in South Sudan, but grew up in Salt Lake City, Utah, attending East High School. He played club soccer with Sparta United, and was the Tosh Athlete of the Year in 2019.

In 2019, Jiba attended Salt Lake Community College to play college soccer. Between 2019 and 2021, Jiba made 48 appearances for the Bruins, scoring 25 goals and tallying 20 assists. Jiba earned regional first team honors three times and was the 2019 NJCAA Region 18 Player of the Year.

In 2021, Jiba also played in the USL League Two with Park City Red Wolves, making a single appearance and scoring a single goal.

Professional
On 18 February 2022, Jiba signed with USL League One side Union Omaha. He made his professional league debut for Omaha on 9 April 2022, starting in a 2–2 draw with Forward Madison FC.

In December 2022, it was announced Jiba was eligible for selection in the 2023 MLS SuperDraft. On 21 December 2022, Jiba was selected 19th overall by Minnesota United FC. On 12 January 2023, it was announced that Jiba had officially signed with Minnesota United for a USL League One record transfer fee received.

References

External links
 Profile at SLCC Athletics

2001 births
Living people
Association football midfielders
Expatriate soccer players in the United States
Minnesota United FC draft picks
Minnesota United FC players
Soccer players from Salt Lake City
Soccer players from Utah
South Sudanese expatriate footballers
South Sudanese footballers
Sportspeople from Salt Lake City
Union Omaha players
USL League One players
USL League Two players